Lombardi's is a pizzeria located at 32 Spring Street on the corner of Mott Street in the Nolita neighborhood in the borough of Manhattan, New York City. Opened in 1905, it has been recognized by the Pizza Hall of Fame as the first pizzeria in the United States.

History
It is believed that Italian immigrant Gennaro Lombardi started the business in 1897 as a grocery store at 53½ Spring Street, and began selling tomato pies wrapped in paper and tied with a string at lunchtime to workers from the area's factories. In 1905 Lombardi received a business license to operate a pizzeria restaurant, and soon had a clientele that included Italian tenor Enrico Caruso. Lombardi later passed the business on to his son, George.

In 1984, the original Lombardi's closed, but reopened 10 years later a block away at 32 Spring Street, run by Gennaro Lombardi III, Gennaro Lombardi's grandson, and his childhood friend John Brescio. This hiatus and location change surrendered the title of America's oldest pizzeria to Papa's Tomato Pies in Trenton, New Jersey, which opened in 1912 and has sold pies without interruption since. Brescio, who remains the current owner, was named as a captain in the Genovese crime family by law enforcement in 2017.

In 2005, Lombardi's offered entire pizzas for 5 cents, their 1905 price, to commemorate the 100th anniversary of the first pizza sold at its original location. They did this promotion again in 2015 for the 110th anniversary.

In 2019, suspicion was raised about whether Gennaro Lombardi was the true founder, after a search of his birth record, naturalization papers, and other supporting documents show he first came to America in November 1904 at age 17, classified as a "laborer." If he became involved with the pizzeria at 53 1/2 Spring Street in 1905, it was as an employee not as an owner. Research suggests Filippo Milone opened the pizzeria.

Although there is dispute over the status of Lombardi's as the oldest continuously operating pizzeria, its establishment is linked to the current $45 billion pizza industry.

See also
 List of Italian restaurants
 List of restaurants in New York City

References

External links

 
 "Slice of the City: New York" Pizza magazine article

Italian-American culture in New York City
Pizzerias in New York City
Restaurants in Manhattan
Restaurants established in 1905
Nolita
1905 establishments in New York City
Re-established companies
Italian-American organized crime